Fowler, Dick & Walker, later known as Fowler's, was a chain of department stores, also called The Boston Store. They started business as a very small dry goods store in Wilkes-Barre, Pennsylvania in 1879, occupying space in another establishment at 120 South Main Street. The founders were George Fowler, Alexander Dick and Gilbert Walker. They had previous employment experience in the dry goods business in Connecticut.

The first store opened for business on April 5, 1879. By December, they were advertising in other nearby towns, and by February had 18 employees.

In 1882, they opened a Binghamton, New York branch. In 1889, there was also an Evansville, Indiana branch of the business, well-known in the region by 1892. By 1904, they were advertising their new store location in Binghamton, New York on Court Street and Water Street. The "new" store was the flagship for over 75 years, with another and is still in use as a Boscov's department store .

The Indiana subsidiary was dissolved in 1934. Another Fowler's opened in 1975 in the Oakdale Mall in Johnson City, close to Binghamton, but the main store on Court Street continued to function.

The main Wilkes-Barre store was severely damaged in the Hurricane Agnes flood in 1972 while at the same time Wilkes-Barre’s Wyoming Valley Mall opened. 
A branch store was opened in the Laurel Mall in Hazleton, Pennsylvania, which Fowler, Dick and Walker also developed. 
The combination of the slowdown at the main Wilkes-Barre store and the expense of opening the new store which started off slowly, proved too much. Fowler, Dick and Walker celebrated its 100th anniversary in 1979 and then was sold first to a local entrepreneur and then to Boscov's. 
Both the Wilkes-Barre and Hazleton stores became very successful Boscov's locations and are open in 2019. 

In Binghamton by 1980, Fowler’s had gone through several corporate owners, and the parent company declared bankruptcy. At the time, Fowler's had the original Wilkes-Barre store (now occupying the whole of the building) and two Binghamton-area locations The Binghamton store was shut down in 1980–1981. The Wilkes-Barre store converted to a Boscov's without closing. Hess's took over the Oakdale Mall location, which later became a Bon-Ton, now closed.

References

1879 establishments in Pennsylvania
Defunct department stores based in Pennsylvania
Defunct department stores based in New York State
Companies based in Binghamton, New York
Wilkes-Barre, Pennsylvania